Nationwide was an Australian ABC TV current affairs program which ran from 1979 to 1984.  It was a successor to This Day Tonight (1967–1978) and a predecessor to The National (1985), which after proving unsuccessful was replaced by The 7.30 Report  in January 1986.

References

1979 Australian television series debuts
1984 Australian television series endings
Australian Broadcasting Corporation original programming
English-language television shows
Australian non-fiction television series
ABC News and Current Affairs